An archer is a person who practices archery, using a bow to shoot arrows.

Archer or Archers may also refer to:

People and fictional characters 
 Archer (given name), including a list of people and fictional characters
 Archer (surname), including a list of people and fictional characters
 Baron Archer, an extinct title in the Peerage of Great Britain

Places

Antarctica 
 Archer Glacier, Graham Land
 Archer Point, Oates Land
 Archer Peak, Victoria Land

Australia 
 Archer, Northern Territory, a suburb of Palmerston
 Archer Creek, west of Sydney Harbour
 Archer River, Cape York Peninsula
 Mount Archer, Queensland (Rockhampton Region), Queensland
 Mount Archer, Queensland (Somerset Region), Queensland

United States 
 Archer, Florida, a city
 Archer, Idaho, an unincorporated community
 Archer, Illinois, an unincorporated community
 Archer, Iowa, a city
 Archer, Nebraska, an unincorporated community
 Archer, Nevada, a former mining camp
 Archer, Tennessee, an unincorporated community
 Archer, West Virginia, an unincorporated community
 Archer County, Texas
 Archer City, Texas
 Archer Key, an island in Florida
 Archer Township, Harrison County, Ohio

Arts and entertainment

Films 
 "The Archers", the British film-making partnership of Powell and Pressburger
 Archer (film), a 1985 Australian TV film about the horse Archer (see Sports section)
 The Archer (film), a 1982 Finnish drama film
 The Archer, a 2005 film directed by John Palmer
 The Archer, a 2017 drama film directed by Valerie Weiss

Fictional characters
 Archer (character class), an archetype found in many fantasy fiction and role-playing games
 Archer (DC Comics), a fictional character
 Archer (Fate/stay night), a character in Fate/stay night media
 Archer (Marvel Comics), an X-Factor character in Marvel Comics
 Archer, a titular character from the Valiant Comics book Archer & Armstrong

Statues and sculptures 
 The Archer (Lepcke), a statue in Poland
 The Archer (Moore), an abstract sculpture
 The Archer, a statue by Eric Aumonier at East Finchley tube station, London

Television
 Archer (1975 TV series), an NBC television series
 Archer (2009 TV series), an American animated television series

Other arts and entertainment
 Archers, a 1935-1937 painting by Ernst Ludwig Kirchner
 The Archers, a long-running BBC Radio 4 soap opera
 The Archers (musical group), a Christian music band
 "The Archer" (song), a 2019 song by Taylor Swift

Companies
 Archer Capital, an Australian private equity firm
 Archer Mobile, a mobile technology company
 Archer Aviation, an American electric aircraft company

Military 
 Archer (tank destroyer), Self Propelled 17pdr, Valentine, Mk I, a British self'propelled anti-tank gun
 AA-11 Archer, NATO reporting name of the Vympel R-73 air-to-air missile
 Archer Artillery System, a partnership to develop a self-propelled artillery system for Sweden and Norway
 Operation Archer, a Canadian Forces operation supporting Operation Enduring Freedom in Afghanistan
 Archer (ship), various naval ships
 Archer class (disambiguation), various ship classes

Sports 
 Archer (horse) (1856–1872), Australian racehorse that won the first two Melbourne Cups in 1861 and 1862
 Archer Grand Prix cycle race, international cycle race held annually in Britain for over 50 years
 Archers Lacrosse Club, American lacrosse team in the Premier Lacrosse League
 Bydgoszcz Archers, American football team from Bydgoszcz, Poland

Transportation 
 Archer (automobile), a British cyclecar
 35th/Archer station, a Chicago Transit Authority station
 Piper Archer, Piper PA-28 Cherokee airplane; discontinued in 2009
 Rue des Archers, a street in Lyon, France
 Archer Avenue, outside Chicago, Illinois, United States

Other uses 
 "The Archer", another name for the constellation Sagittarius or the astrological sign of the same name
 Archer High School, a public high school in Lawrenceville, Georgia, United States
 Archer (typeface), a slab serif style digital typeface
 Airborne Real-time Cueing Hyperspectral Enhanced Reconnaissance (ARCHER), an aerial imaging system
 Advanced Research Computing High End Resource (ARCHER), a UK supercomputer - see Edinburgh Parallel Computing Centre

See also 

 
 
 
 Archery (disambiguation)
 Archar (disambiguation)